Torqabeh Rural District is a rural district (dehestan) in Torqabeh District, Torqabeh and Shandiz County, Razavi Khorasan province, Iran. According to the 2006 census, its population was 10,288, in 2,847 families.  The rural district has 33 villages.

References 

Rural Districts of Razavi Khorasan Province
Torqabeh and Shandiz County